Forestdale is an unincorporated community and census-designated place (CDP) in Jefferson County, Alabama, United States. It is north of the Birmingham city neighborhood of Ensley. At the 2020 census, the population was 10,409.

Geography
Forestdale is located at  (33.574305, -86.902937).

Demographics

2000 census
At the 2000 census, there were 10,509 people, 4,161 households and 3,099 families living in the community. The racial make-up of the community was 52.87% White, 45.92% Black or African American, 0.16% Native American, 0.35% Asian, 0.17% from other races and 0.52% from two or more races. 0.46% of the population were Hispanic or Latino of any race.

There were 4,161 households, of which 30.6% had children under the age of 18 living with them, 58.5% were married couples living together, 13.0% had a female householder with no husband present and 25.5% were non-families. 23.1% of all households were made up of individuals and 11.2% had someone living alone who was 65 years of age or older. The average household size was 2.53 and the average family size was 2.97.

22.8% of the population were under the age of 18, 7.4% from 18 to 24, 26.1% from 25 to 44, 26.3% from 45 to 64 and 17.4% who were 65 years of age or older. The median age was 41 years. For every 100 females, there were 88.5 males. For every 100 females age 18 and over, there were 84.7 males.

The median household income was $43,111 and the median family income was $51,188. Males had a median income of $36,048 and females $30,135. The per capita income was $19,954. About 4.4% of families and 6.4% of the population were below the poverty line, including 5.4% of those under age 18 and 8.8% of those age 65 or over.

2010 census
At the 2010 census, there were 10,162 people, 3,963 households and 2,834 families living in the community. There were 4,365 housing units at an average density of. The racial make-up of the community was 71.4% Black or African American, 26.2% White, 0.2% Native American, 0.2% Asian, 0.9% from other races and 1.0% from two or more races. 1.4% of the population were Hispanic or Latino of any race.

There were 3,963 households, of which 27.5% had children under the age of 18 living with them, 46.5% were married couples living together, 20.8% had a female householder with no husband present and 28.5% were non-families. 25.2% of all households were made up of individuals and 9.3% had someone living alone who was 65 years of age or older. The average household size was 2.56 and the average family size was 3.06.

23.2% of the population were under the age of 18, 7.9% from 18 to 24, 23.9% from 25 to 44, 30.2% from 45 to 64 and 14.7% who were 65 years of age or older. The median age was 40.9 years. For every 100 females, there were 86.8 males. For every 100 females age 18 and over, there were 84.9 males.

The median household income was $52,605 and the median family income was $60,067. Males had a median income of $42,207 and females $36,417. The per capita income was $23,819. About 6.4% of families and 8.7% of the population were below the poverty line, including 12.6% of those under age 18 and 1.8% of those age 65 or over.

2020 census

At the 2020 United States census, there were 10,409 people, 3,776 households and 2,484 families residing in the CDP.

References

Unincorporated communities in Alabama
Census-designated places in Jefferson County, Alabama
Census-designated places in Alabama
Birmingham metropolitan area, Alabama
Unincorporated communities in Jefferson County, Alabama